Herman D. Umbstaetter( February 26, 1851 - November 25, 1913) was an American businessman, and the founder of the magazine The Black Cat.

References 

1851 births
1913 deaths